Mythimna dasuta is a moth of the family Noctuidae. It was first described by George Hampson in 1905. It is endemic to the island of Hawaii.

External links

Mythimna (moth)
Endemic moths of Hawaii
Moths described in 1905